Test cricket is the oldest form of cricket played at international level. A Test match is scheduled to take place over a period of five days, and is played by teams representing Full Member nations of the International Cricket Council (ICC). Pakistan obtained Full Member status of the ICC in 1952, becoming the seventh nation eligible to play Test cricket. The Pakistan national cricket team played their first Test match on 16 October 1952 against India which they lost by an innings and 70 runs. They recorded their first victory in their second ever match against India on 23 October 1952. Since then, they have played 434 matches, against every other Test-playing nation. , Pakistan is the fourth-most successful team in Test cricket with an overall winning percentage of 32.87, behind Australia (47.39), South Africa (38.46) and England (36.39).

Top order batsman and former captain Younis Khan holds several Pakistan batting records. He has scored the most runs (10,099) for Pakistan in Test cricket – the first and only player to score over 10,000 runs in the format for his country. He is the record holder for the highest number of centuries (34) as well as the highest number of double centuries (six with Javed Miandad) for Pakistan. Hanif Mohammad's 337 runs against the West Indies in 1958 is the highest individual score by a Pakistani cricketer, surpassing the previous best of 209 by Imtiaz Ahmed, which was established in 1955. It is also the eighth-highest individual score in Test cricket. Hanif, Inzamam-ul-Haq (329), Younis Khan (313) and Azhar Ali (302 not out) are the only Pakistani players who have scored triple centuries.

Wasim Akram, regarded as "one of the greatest left-arm bowlers in the history of world cricket", holds several Test records. He holds the record for the most Test wickets (414) as well as the record for the most five wickets per innings (25) for Pakistan. Akram also holds the record of highest individual score batting at number 8 (257 not out) in Test cricket. This feat was achieved in 1996 playing against Zimbabwe. Abdul Qadir's nine wickets for 56 runs, against England at Gaddafi Stadium in 1987, is the best bowling figures in an innings by a Pakistani bowler. 14 wickets for 116 runs by Imran Khan against Sri Lanka in 1982 at the same ground is the best bowling performance in a Test by a Pakistani player. He also holds the record for best bowling average for Pakistan with 22.81. Younis Khan took 139 catches from 118 matches as fielder, the most by a Pakistani and twelfth-highest overall. Wasim Bari is Pakistan's most successful wicket-keeper having taken 228 dismissals; he is eleventh in the list of most dismissals in Test cricket.

Key
The top five records are listed for each category, except in "team wins, losses, and draws" and "highest wicket partnerships". Tied records for the fifth place are listed as well. Explanations of the general symbols and cricketing terms used in the list are given below. Specific details are provided in each category where appropriate.

Team records

Team wins, losses, and draws
Pakistan has played 451 Test matches resulting in 146 victories, 139 defeats and 166 draws for an overall winning percentage of 32.37, the fourth-highest winning percentage of Test playing teams. A tie can occur when the scores of both teams are equal at the conclusion of play, provided that the side batting last has completed their innings. Only two matches have ended in a tie in Test cricket history, neither of which involved Pakistan.

First Test series wins

First Test match wins

Team scoring records

Most runs in an innings

The highest innings total scored in Test cricket came in the series between Sri Lanka and India in August 1997. Playing in the first Test at the R. Premadasa Stadium in Colombo, the hosts posted a first innings total of 952/6d. This broke the longstanding record of 903/7d which England set against Australia in the final Test of the 1938 Ashes series at The Oval. The first Test of the 2008–09 series against Sri Lanka saw Pakistan set their highest innings total of 765/5d, the fifth-highest score in Test cricket.

Highest successful run chases
Pakistan's highest fourth innings total is 450 all out in an unsuccessful run chase against Australia at Brisbane in December 2016. Australia had set a target of 490. Pakistan's second highest fourth innings total of 443/7 also came against Australia at Karachi in 2022.

Lowest runs in an innings

Most runs conceded in an innings
The highest innings total scored against Pakistan is by West Indies when they scored 790/3d in the third Test of the Pakistan's tour of West Indies in 1958 at Sabina Park.

Lowest runs conceded in an innings
The lowest innings total scored against Pakistan is 53 in the first test of West Indies tour of Pakistan in 1986

Result records
A Test match is won when one side has scored more runs than the total runs scored by the opposing side during their two innings. If both sides have completed both their allocated innings and the side that fielded last has the higher aggregate of runs, it is known as a win by runs. This indicates the number of runs that they had scored more than the opposing side. If one side scores more runs in a single innings than the total runs scored by the other side in both their innings, it is known as a win by innings and runs. If the side batting last wins the match, it is known as a win by wickets, indicating the number of wickets that were still to fall.

Greatest win margins (by innings)

The fifth Test of the 1938 Ashes series at The Oval saw England win by an innings and 579 runs, the largest victory by an innings in Test cricket history. The fifth-largest victory was Pakistan's win against New Zealand in the first Test of the 2002 tour at the Gaddafi Stadium, where the hosts won by an innings and 324 runs.

Greatest win margins (by runs)
The greatest winning margin by runs in Test cricket was England's victory over Australia by 675 runs in the first Test of the 1928–29 Ashes series. Pakistan's largest victory by runs was recorded in the second Test of the 2018–19 series where they defeated Australia by 373 runs.

Greatest win margins (by 10 wickets)
Pakistan have won a Test match by a margin of 10 wickets on 13 occasions, rank fourth in the list after Australia (28), West Indies (25) and England (20).

Narrowest win margins (by runs)
Pakistan's narrowest win by runs was against India in the first Test of the 1998–99 series at M.Chinnaswamy Stadium, Chennai. Set 271 runs for victory in the final innings, India were bowled all out for 258 to give victory to Pakistan by twelve runs. This was the twelfth-narrowest win in the history of Test cricket.

Narrowest win margins (by wickets)
Out of twelve occasions, Pakistan have achieved their narrowest win of one-wicket victory twice. Their first-narrowest win by wickets came in the first Test of the Australia tour of Pakistan in 1994–95. Played at the National Stadium in Karachi, the hosts won the match by a margin of one wicket. Pakistan repeated the feat against Bangladesh at Multan Cricket Stadium in 2003.

Greatest loss margins (by innings)
Lord's in London played host Pakistan's greatest defeat by an innings in Test cricket. The final Test of the 2010 series saw England defeat the tourists by an innings and 225 runs, to win the series 2–0.

Greatest loss margins (by runs)
The first Test of the 2004–05 series saw Pakistan defeated by Australia by 491 runs, fourth greatest losing margin by runs in Test cricket.

Greatest loss margins (by 10 wickets)
Pakistan have lost a Test match by a margin of 10 wickets on nine occasions.

Narrowest loss margins (by runs)

Narrowest loss margins (by wickets)
Test cricket has seen fifteen matches been decided by a margin of one wicket, with Pakistan being defeated twice, both coming against West Indies. The first was the final Test of the 1999–2000 series at Antigua Recreation Ground where the West Indies ran down the target of 216 runs in the final inning and the second happened in the opening test of the 2021 series at Sabina Park where the last wicket pair scored the last 17 runs to chase down 168.

Individual records

Batting records

Most career runs
A run is the basic means of scoring in cricket.

India's Sachin Tendulkar has scored the most runs in Test cricket with 15,921. Second is Ricky Ponting of Australia with 13,378 ahead of Jacques Kallis from South Africa in third with 13,289. Younis Khan is the only Pakistani batsman who has scored more than 10,000 runs in Test cricket.

Fastest runs getter

Most runs in each batting position

Most runs against each team

Highest individual score
Hanif Mohammad set the highest Test score for Pakistan with 337, surpassing Imtiaz Ahmed's 209 scored against New Zealand in October 1955 at Bagh-e-Jinnah. Inzamam-ul-Haq (329), Younis Khan (313) and Azhar Ali (302*) are the only others to sore a triple century for Pakistan.

Highest individual score – progression of record

Highest individual score against each team

Highest career average
A batsman's batting average is the total number of runs they have scored divided by the number of times they have been dismissed.

Pakistan's Javed Miandad, finished his Test career with an average of 52.57. The next closest Pakistani to him is Mohammad Yousuf who retired in 2012 with an average of 52.29.

Highest Average in each batting position

Most half-centuries
A half-century is a score of between 50 and 99 runs. Statistically, once a batsman's score reaches 100, it is no longer considered a half-century but a century.

Sachin Tendulkar of India has score the most half-centuries in Test cricket with 68. He is followed by the West Indies' Shivnarine Chanderpaul on 66, Pakistan's Inzamam-ul-Haq has 46 fifties to his name.

Most Test centuries
A century is a score of 100 or more runs in a single innings.

Tendulkar has also scored the most centuries in Test cricket with 51. South Africa's Jacques Kallis is next on 45 and Ponting with 41 hundreds is in third. Younis Khan is the highest century-maker for Pakistan.

Most double centuries
A double century is a score of 200 or more runs in a single innings.

Dona Bradman holds the Test record scored with twelve for the most double centuries, one ahead of Sri Lanka's Kumar Sangakkara who finished his career with eleven. In third is Brian Lara of the West Indies with nine. England's Wally Hammond and Mahela Jayawardene of Sri Lanka both scored seven, and Miandad and Younis Khan are two of six cricketers who reached the mark on six occasions.

Most triple centuries
A triple century is a score of 300 or more runs in a single innings.

Virender Sehwag of India Sehwag along with Australia's Don Bradman and West Indians Chris Gayle and Brian Lara holds the equal Test record for the most triple centuries scored with two. 4 Pakistani batsmen have scored a single Test triple century .

Most Sixes

Most Fours

Most runs in a series

Test cricket is the oldest form of cricket played at international level. The 1930 Ashes series in England saw Bradman set the record for the most runs scored in a single series, falling just 26 short of 1,000 runs. He is followed by Wally Hammond with 905 runs scored in the 1928–29 Ashes series. Mark Taylor with 839 in the 1989 Ashes and Neil Harvey with 834 in 1952–53 South Africa series are third and fourth on the list, respectively. Pakistani cricketer Mudassar Nazar is seventeenth in the list with 761.

Most ducks
A duck refers to a batsman dismissed without scoring a run. West Indian Courtney Walsh has the most ducks to his name with 43. Pakistan's Danish Kaneria has scored the ninth-highest number of ducks in Test cricket along with Indian cricketer Ishant Sharma with 25.

Bowling records

Most career wickets

A bowler takes the wicket of a batsman when the form of dismissal is bowled, caught, leg before wicket, stumped or hit wicket. If the batsman is dismissed by run out, obstructing the field, handling the ball, hitting the ball twice or timed out the bowler does not receive credit.

Shane Warne held the record for the most Test wickets with 708 until December 2007 when Sri Lankan bowler Muttiah Muralitharan passed Warne's milestone. Muralitharan, who continued to play until 2010, finished with 800 wickets to his name. James Anderson of England is third on the list taking 632 wickets holds the record for most wickets by a fast bowler in Test cricket. Wasim Akram is the highest wicket taker for Pakistan with 414.

Most career wickets against each team

Fastest wicket taker

Best figures in an innings
Bowling figures refers to the number of the wickets a bowler has taken and the number of runs conceded.

There has been two occasions in Test cricket where a bowler has taken all ten wickets in a single innings – Jim Laker of England took 10/53 against Australia in 1956 and India's Anil Kumble in 1999 returned figures of 10/74 against Pakistan. Abdul Qadir is one of 15 bowlers who has taken nine wickets in a Test match innings.

Best figures in a match

A bowler's bowling figures in a match is sum of the wickets taken and the runs conceded in two innings.

No bowler in the history of Test cricket has taken all 20 wickets in a match. The closest to do so was English spin bowler Jim Laker. During the fourth Test of the 1956 Ashes series, Laker took 9/37 in the first innings and 10/53 in the second to finish with match figures of 19/90. Imran Khan's figures of 14/119, taken in finaal match of the 1981–82 Test series against Sri Lanka, is the sixteenth-best in Test cricket history.

Best figures in an innings against each team

Best career average
A bowler's bowling average is the total number of runs they have conceded divided by the number of wickets they have taken.

Nineteenth century English medium pacer George Lohmann holds the record for the best career average in Test cricket with 10.75. J. J. Ferris, one of fourteen cricketers to play Test cricket for more than one team, is second behind Lohmann with an overall career average of 12.70 runs per wicket. Hasan Ali's bowling average of 22.09 are the best figures for Pakistan.

Best career economy rate
A bowler's economy rate is the total number of runs they have conceded divided by the number of overs they have bowled.

English bowler William Attewell, who played 10 matches for England between 1884 and 1892, holds the Test record for the best career economy rate with 1.31. Pervez Sajjad, with a rate of 2.04 runs per over conceded over his 19-match Test career, is the best for Pakistan.

Best career strike rate

A bowler's strike rate is the total number of balls they have bowled divided by the number of wickets they have taken.

English George Lohmann has best Test career strike rate with 34.1; Waqar Younis of Pakistan with an overall career strike rate of 43.4 balls per wicket, is eighth in the list.

Most five-wicket hauls in an innings
A five-wicket haul refers to a bowler taking five wickets in a single innings.

Sri Lanka's Muttiah Muralitharan has taken the most number five-wicket hauls in Test cricket with 67 throughout his career. former Pakistani captain Wasim Akram is tenth on the list and leading the equivalent list for Pakistan.

Most ten-wicket hauls in a match
A ten-wicket haul refers to a bowler taking ten or more wickets in a match over two innings.

Muttiah Muralitharan of Sri Lanka has taken the most ten-wicket hauls in Test cricket with 22. Imran Khan, jointly tenth with Derek Underwood of England, leads the equivalent list for Pakistan with 6 ten-wicket hauls.

Worst figures in an innings
The worst figures in a single innings in Test cricket came in the third Test between the West Indies at home to Pakistan in 1958. Pakistan's Khan Mohammad returned figures of 0/259 from his 54 overs in the second innings of the match.

Worst figures in a match
The worst figures in a match in Test cricket were taken by South Africa's Imran Tahir in the 2006 Boxing Day Test match against Australia. He returned figures of 0/180 from his 23 overs in the first innings and 0/80 off 14 in the third innings for a total 0/260 from 37 overs. He claimed the record in his final over when two runs came from it—enough for him to pass the previous record of 0/259, set 48 years prior by Pakistan's Khan Mohammad.

Most wickets in a series
South Africa's seventh Test tour of England in 1913–14 saw the record set for the most wickets taken by a bowler in a Test series. English paceman Sydney Barnes played in four of the five matches and achieved a total of 49 wickets to his name. Jim Laker sits second on the list with 46 wickets taken during the 1956 Ashes series. Pakistan's Imran Khan is seventh with his 40 wickets taken against India during the 1982–83 tour.

Hat-trick
In cricket, a hat-trick occurs when a bowler takes three wickets with consecutive deliveries. The deliveries may be interrupted by an over bowled by another bowler from the other end of the pitch or the other team's innings, but must be three consecutive deliveries by the individual bowler in the same match. Only wickets attributed to the bowler count towards a hat-trick; run outs do not count.
In Test cricket history there have been just 44 hat-tricks, the first achieved by Fred Spofforth for Australia against England in 1879. In 1912, Australian Jimmy Matthews achieved the feat twice in one game against South Africa. The only other players to achieve two hat-tricks are Australia's Hugh Trumble, against England in 1902 and 1904, Pakistan's Wasim Akram, in separate games against Sri Lanka in 1999, and England's Stuart Broad.

Wicket-keeping records
The wicket-keeper is a specialist fielder who stands behind the stumps being guarded by the batsman on strike and is the only member of the fielding side permitted to wear gloves and external leg guards.

Most career dismissals
A wicket-keeper can be credited with the dismissal of batsman in two ways, caught or stumped. A fair catch is a taken when the ball is caught fully within the field of play without it bouncing when the ball has touched the striker's bat or glove holding the bat, while a stumping occurs when the wicket-keeper puts down the wicket while the batsman out of his ground and not attempting a run.

Pakistan's Wasim Bari is eleventh in taking most dismissals in Test cricket as a designated wicket-keeper with 228.

Most career catches
Bari leads in the list of most catches taken as a designated wicket-keeper in Test cricket for Pakistan, with 201.

Most career stumpings
Bert Oldfield, Australia's fifth-most capped wicket-keeper, holds the record for most stumpings in Test cricket with 52. He is followed by England's Godfrey Evans with 46 to his name. Indian glovemen Syed Kirmani and MS Dhoni are both equal third on 38 and Bari is eighth in the list with 27.

Most dismissals in an innings
Four wicket-keepers have taken seven wickets in a single innings in a Test match—Wasim Bari of Pakistan in 1979, Englishman Bob Taylor in 1980, New Zealand's Ian Smith in 1991 and most recently West Indian gloveman Ridley Jacobs against Australia in 2000.

The feat of taking 6 wickets in an innings has been achieved by 22 wicket-keepers on 30 occasions including two Pakistanis.

Most dismissals in a match
Three wicket-keepers have made 11 dismissals in a Test match, Englishman Jack Russell in 1995, South African AB de Villiers in 2013 and most recently India's Rishabh Pant against Australia in 2018.

The feat of making 10 dismissals in a match has been achieved by 4 wicket-keepers on 4 occasions with Sarfaraz Ahmed being the only Pakistani wicket-keeper.

Most dismissals in a series
Brad Haddin holds the Test cricket record for the most dismissals taken by a wicket-keeper in a series. He took 29 catches during the 2013 Ashes series which broke the previous record held by fellow Australian Rod Marsh where he took 28 catches in the 1982–83 Ashes series. Rashid Latif has the most dismissals for Pakistan in a Test series.

Fielding records

Most career catches
Caught is one of the ten methods a batsman can be dismissed in cricket. A fair catch is defined as a fielder catches the ball, from a legal delivery, fully within the field of play without it bouncing when the ball has touched the striker's bat or glove holding the bat. The majority of catches are caught in the slips, located behind the batsman, next to the wicket-keeper, on the off side of the field. Most slip fielders are top order batsmen.

India's Rahul Dravid holds the record for the most catches in Test cricket by a non-wicket-keeper with 210, followed by Mahela Jayawardene of Sri Lanka on 205 and South African Jacques Kallis with 200. Younis Khan is the highest-ranked Pakistani and twelfth overall, securing 139 catches in his Test career.

Most catches in a series
The 1920–21 Ashes series, in which Australia whitewashed England 5–0 for the first time, saw the record set for the most catches taken by non-wicket-keeper in a Test series. Australian all-rounder Jack Gregory took 15 catches in the series as well as 23 wickets. Greg Chappell, a fellow Australian all-rounder, is second behind Gregory with 14 catches taken during the 1974–75 Ashes series. Three players have taken 13 catches in a series on five occasions with both Bob Simpson and Brian Lara having done so twice and Rahul Dravid once. Younis Khan has taken 10 catches, the most by a Pakistani.

All-round records

1000 runs and 100 wickets
A total of 71 players have achieved the double of 1000 runs and 100 wickets in their Test career.

Other records

Most career matches

India's Sachin Tendulkar holds the record for the most Test matches played with 200 with former captains in Ricky Ponting and Steve Waugh being joint second with each having represented Australia on 168 occasions. Javed Miandad played for Pakistan in 124 matches.

Most consecutive career matches
Former English captain Alastair Cook holds the record for the most consecutive Test matches played with 159. He broke Allan Border's long standing record of 153 matches in June 2018. Asad Shafiq, the Pakistan batsmen has played in 72 consecutive Test matches.

Most matches as captain

Graeme Smith, who led the South African cricket team from 2003 to 2014, holds the record for the most matches played as captain in Test cricket with 109. Allan Border, the man who skippered Australia from 1984 to 1994 is second with 93 matches. New Zealand's captain from 1997 to 2006, Stephen Fleming, is third on the list with 80 and in fourth on 77 is Australia's Ricky Ponting who led the side for six years from 2004 to 2010. Pakistan's Misbah-ul-Haq is ninth in the list along with Sri Lankan Arjuna Ranatunga.

Youngest players
The youngest player to play in a Test match is claimed to be Hasan Raza at the age of 14 years and 227 days. Making his debut for Pakistan against Zimbabwe on 24 October 1996, there is some doubt as to the validity of Raza's age at the time. The second- and third-youngest players are also from Pakistan—Mushtaq Mohammad and Aaqib Javedwith at 15 years and 124 days and 16 years and 189 days, respectively.

Oldest players on debut

At 49 years and 119 days, James Southerton of England, playing in the very first Test match in March 1877, is the oldest player to make his debut in Test cricket. Second on the list is Miran Bakhsh of Pakistan who at 47 years and 284 days made his debut against India in 1955. Australia's Don Blackie is the third-oldest player to make his debut, breaking into the side during the second Test of the 1928–29 Ashes series at the age of 46 years and 253 days.

Oldest players
England all-rounder Wilfred Rhodes is the oldest player to appear in a Test match. Playing in the fourth Test against the West Indies in 1930 at Sabina Park, in Kingston, Jamaica, he was aged 52 years and 165 days on the final day's play. The oldest Pakistani Test player is Miran Bakhsh who was aged 47 years and 298 days when he represented Pakistan for the final time in the 1955 tour of India at the Peshawar Club Ground.

Partnership records
In cricket, two batsman are always present at the crease batting together in a partnership. This partnership will continue until one of them is dismissed, retires or the innings comes to a close.

Highest partnerships by wicket
A wicket partnership describes the number of runs scored before each wicket falls. The first wicket partnership is between the opening batsman and continues until the first wicket falls. The second wicket partnership then commences between the not out batsman and the number three batsman. This partnership continues until the second wicket falls. The third wicket partnership then commences between the not out batsman and the new batsman. This continues down to tenth wicket partnership. When the eleventh wicket has fallen, there is no more batsman left so the innings is closed.

Highest partnerships by runs
The highest Test partnership by runs for any wicket is held by the Sri Lankan pairing of Kumar Sangakkara and Mahela Jayawardene who put together a third wicket partnership of 624 runs during the first Test against South Africa in July 2006. This broke the record of 576 runs set by their compatriots Sanath Jayasuriya and Roshan Mahanama against India in 1997. New Zealand's Andrew Jones and Martin Crowe hold the third-highest Test partnership with 467 made in 1991 against Sri Lanka. Equal fourth on the list is Mudassar Nazar and Javed Miandad of Pakistan who together scored 451 against Pakistan in 1983 and the Australian pairing of Bill Ponsford and Don Bradman putting on the same score against England in the 1934 Ashes series.

Highest overall partnership runs by a pair

Umpiring records

Most matches umpired

An umpire in cricket is a person who officiates the match according to the laws of cricket. Two umpires adjudicate the match on the field, whilst a third umpire has access to video replays, and a fourth umpire looks after the match balls and other duties. The records below are only for on-field umpires.

Aleem Dar of Pakistan holds the record for the most Test matches umpired with 136. The current active Dar set the record in December 2019 overtaking Steve Bucknor from the West Indies mark of 128 matches. They are followed by South Africa's Rudi Koertzen who officiated in 108.

See also

 Cricket statistics
 List of Test cricket records
 List of Pakistan One Day International cricket records

Notes

References

Test
Pakistan in international cricket